Loes Sels (born 25 July 1985) is a Belgian cyclist, who currently competes in cyclo-cross for UCI Cyclo-cross Team IKO–Crelan. She represented her nation in the women's elite event at the 2016 UCI Cyclo-cross World Championships  in Heusden-Zolder. Sels was Belgian cyclo-cross champion in the elite category (2007, 2008). Sels' cousin Sanne Cant is also a professional cyclist.

References

External links
 

1985 births
Living people
Cyclo-cross cyclists
Belgian female cyclists
Place of birth missing (living people)
Belgian cyclo-cross champions
Sportspeople from Turnhout
Cyclists from Antwerp Province